Fara Rah Pouyan (Persian: فرا راه پویان) was founded in 2013 by Ahmadreza Naraghi and is in the business of construction of exhibition stands and exhibit design; the planning, designing, and construction of exclusive exhibition booths for trade shows in Iran and offshore.

Founding
Fara Rah Pouyan was founded by Ahmadreza Naraghi, on July 23, 2013.

References

Iranian companies established in 2013
Event management companies of Iran
Design companies established in 2010